Baghahandi is a village in Subarnapur district, Orissa, India, covering an area of  and with a population (2001 census) of 1088 in 243 households. The village has a school and an Anganwadi centre.

References

Villages in Subarnapur district